Laurenz Lütteken (born 9 September 1964 in Essen) is a German musicologist. Since 2001, he has been Ordinarius for musicology at the University of Zürich. Since 2013, he is General editor of MGG Online.

Writings 
 As Author
 Guillaume Dufay und die isorhythmic motet. Hamburg 1993.
 (with Christoph Wagner): Die Apotheose des Chorals Homo absconditus. Stuttgart 1997.
 Das Monologische als Denkform in der Musik zwischen 1760 und 1785. Tübingen 1998.
 Contribution to Ludwig Finscher: Bowed string instrument. Stuttgart 2001.
 Mozart. Leben und Musik im Zeitalter der Aufklärung. Beck, Munich 2017, .

 As publisher
 (with Axel Beer): Festschrift Klaus Hortschansky zum 60. Geburtstag. Tutzing 1995.
 Mass and Motets. Kassel 2002.
 (with Gerhard Splitt): Metastasio im Deutschland der Aufklärung. Tübingen 2002.
 (with Anselm Gerhard): Zwischen Klassik und Klassizismus. Kassel 2003.
 Die Musik in den Zeitschriften des 18. Jahrhunderts. (with CD-ROM), Kassel 2004.
 (with Nicole Schwindt): Autorität und Autoritäten in musikalischer Theorie, Komposition und Aufführung. Kassel 2004.
 (with Hans-Joachim Hinrichsen): Meisterwerke neu gehört. Ein kleiner Kanon der Musik. 14 Werkporträts. Kassel 2004.
 (with Hans-Joachim Hinrichsen): Zwischen Bekenntnis und Verweigerung. Kassel 2005.
 (with Hans-Joachim Hinrichsen): Bruckner – Brahms. Kassel 2006.
 (with Hans-Joachim Hinrichsen) Passagen. Kassel 2007.
 Musikwissenschaft. Eine Positionsbestimmung. Kassel 2007.
 Kunstwerk der Zukunft. Neue Zürcher Zeitung Libro, Zürich 2008.
 (with Hans-Joachim Hinrichsen): Mozarts Lebenswelten. Kassel 2008.
 (with Birgit Lodes): Institutionalisierung als Prozess. Laaber, 2009.
 Musik und Mythos – Mythos Musik um 1900. Kassel 2009.
 (with Urs Fischer): ’Mehr Respekt vor dem tüchtigen Mann’ – Carl Czerny (1791-1857). Kassel 2009.
 Gemeinschaftsausgabe: Wagner-Handbuch. Bärenreiter Verlag, Kassel 2012,  and J. B. Metzler Verlag, Stuttgart 2012, .
 Zwischen Tempel und Verein. Musik und Bürgertum im 19. Jahrhundert. Zürcher Festspiel-Symposium 2012. Bärenreiter, Kassel 2013, . (Recension)

 Editing work
Historical-critical complete edition of the musical works of Arcangelo Corelli
 Werke ohne Opuszahl: vol 5. With Hans J. Marx, Hans Oesch (editor), Laaber, 1976.
 Concerti grossi, opus VI: vol. 4. Rudolf Bossard, Hans-Joachim Hinrichsen, Hans Oesch (editor) Laaber, 1978
 Sonate da Camera, Opus II and IV: vol 2. Hans-Joachim Hinrichsen, Hans Oesch, Jürg Stenzl (editor), Laaber, 1986.
 Sonate da chiesa, Opus I und III with Francesco Geminianis Concerto grosso-Bearbeitungen von sechs Sonaten aus Opus I und III: vol. 1. Hans-Joachim Hinrichsen, Max Lütolf, Hans Oesch (editor) Laaber, 1987.
 Sonate a Violino e Violone o Cimbalo, op. V: vol. 3. Hans-Joachim Hinrichsen, Hans Oesch, Cristina Urchueguía (editor), Martin Zimmermann (preface). Laaber, 2007.

References

External links 
 Laurenz Lütteken on the website of the University of Zürich
 Laurenz Lütteken in der Forschungsdatenbank der Universität Zürich
 

1964 births
Living people
Writers from Essen
20th-century German musicologists
21st-century German musicologists
Academic staff of the University of Zurich
Members of Academia Europaea
Du Fay scholars